Flag of the Latvian Soviet Socialist Republic shows a yellow hammer and sickle and outlined star on a red field above rippling water at the bottom, and was adopted by the (former) Latvian Soviet Socialist Republic on January 17, 1953.

History
The first socialist Latvian state, the Latvian Socialist Soviet Republic, shown a red flag with the inscription LSPR.

Prior to this, from 25 August 1940, the flag was red with the gold hammer and sickle in the top-left corner, with the Latin characters LPSR (Latvijas Padomju Sociālistiskā Republika) above them in gold in a serif font.

The Soviet-era flag was officially replaced on 27 February 1990, when the national Flag of Latvia was reintroduced. In 2013, the use of a Latvian SSR flag in public events is banned.

Gallery

See also

 Coat of arms of the Latvian SSR
 Flag of the Soviet Union
 Flag of Latvia

References

Soviet Socialist Republic
Latvian Soviet Socialist Republic
Latvian Soviet Socialist Republic